During the late 1990s, United Paramount Network produced a number of television films branded "Blockbuster Shockwave Cinema," in conjunction with sponsor (and sister company) Blockbuster Video. Almost all were science fiction films, and likewise, their after-airing availability on home video was exclusive to Blockbuster stores. From UPN's inception until 2000, the network also offered a hosted movie series called the UPN Movie Trailer to their stations. The show featured mostly older Hollywood action and comedy films, often those made by Paramount Pictures. Movie Trailer was discontinued in 2000 to give stations that opted for them room for a second weekend run of Star Trek: Enterprise and America's Next Top Model (and later, Veronica Mars). There were also three Paramount-branded blocks on the company's owned-and-operated stations ("O&Os") only: Paramount Teleplex as the main brand for movies at any given timeslot, Paramount Prime Movie for primetime features, and the Paramount Late Movie on late nights.

This is a brief list of television films produced for UPN, an American broadcast television network:

References

 
UPN
Upn